In theoretical computer science and the study of machine learning, the manifold hypothesis is the hypothesis that many high-dimensional data sets that occur in the real world actually lie along low-dimensional latent manifolds inside that high-dimensional space. As a consequence of the manifold hypothesis, many data sets that appear to initially require many variables to describe, can actually be described by a comparatively small number of variables, likened to the local coordinate system of the underlying manifold. It is suggested that this principle underpins the effectiveness of machine learning algorithms in describing high-dimensional data sets by considering a few common features.

The manifold hypothesis is related to the effectiveness of nonlinear dimensionality reduction techniques in machine learning. Many techniques of dimensional reduction make the assumption that data lies along a low-dimensional submanifold, such as manifold sculpting, manifold alignment, and manifold regularization.

References

Further reading

Machine learning
Theoretical computer science